The NWA Toronto United States Heavyweight Championship was the version of the NWA United States Heavyweight Championship that was defended in Frank Tunney's Toronto-based Maple Leaf Wrestling. It existed from 1962 until 1973. A different version of the title was brought to the territory by The Sheik in 1974 and defended until 1977. After that, Maple Leaf Wrestling recognized the Mid-Atlantic version of the title from May 1978 until July 1984 when promoter Jack Tunney allied himself with the WWF.

Title history
a

See also

National Wrestling Alliance
WWE United States Championship
NWA Canadian Heavyweight Championship (Toronto version)

References

National Wrestling Alliance championships
NWA United States Heavyweight Championships
Maple Leaf Wrestling championships
Heavyweight wrestling championships
Professional wrestling in Toronto